Ford City is an unincorporated community in Gentry County, in the U.S. state of Missouri.

History
The community was named after Nicholas Ford, a U.S. Representative from Missouri. Variant names were "Ford", "Millen", and "Yolo". A post office called Ford was established in 1879; the name was changed to Ford City in 1893, and the post office closed in 1953.

References

Unincorporated communities in Gentry County, Missouri
Unincorporated communities in Missouri